Cap-Chat is a town in the Canadian province of Québec, in the Regional County Municipality of Haute-Gaspésie, and in the administrative region of Gaspésie-Îles-de-la-Madeleine. , Cap-Chat's population is 2,777.

In addition to Cap-Chat itself, the town's territory also includes the communities of Cap-Chat-Est, Capucins, and Petit-Fonds.

History 

There are two theories about the origin of the town's name. One simply holds that the headland called Cap-Chat bore a likeness to a cat ("chat" in French). The other theory is a bit more fanciful. According to a local legend, a cat walking along the shore killed and ate various animals, whereupon the "cat fairy" accused him of having eaten her offspring. For his punishment, the cat was turned into stone for ever.

It seems most likely, however, that the town's name is a corruption of "Aymar de Chaste", who was New France's lieutenant-general in 1603.

The waterfront boardwalk at Cap-Chat has a display of photographs and informative plaques regarding the Second World War Battle of the St. Lawrence between U-Boats and coastal defence ships.

Cap-Chat was one of the prime viewing areas for the total solar eclipse of July 10, 1972.  Unfortunately, cloudy skies prevented most observers from viewing the total phase of the eclipse.

On March 15, 2000, the Municipality of Capucins was amalgamated into the Town of Cap-Chat.

Demographics 

Economy 
Cap-Chat has become synonymous with wind energy. There is a wind farm there containing 76 wind generators in revenue service. Each one of these is a horizontal axis wind turbine (HAWT), but there is also to be seen there one called Éole, which is the world's tallest vertical axis wind turbine (VAWT) at 110 m. It is capable of producing 4 MW of power, but has not been in use for more than ten years following damages sustained during a wind storm. Everything that there is to know about wind power at Cap-Chat may be learnt at the interpretative centre at the wind farm.

Cap-Chat has other things that are worth seeing, such as the aforesaid cat-shaped headland, and a lighthouse.

Those interested in wilderness and spectacular scenery can explore the areas inland from Cap-Chat, where there was once a village called Saint-Octave-de-l'Avenir (which ironically means Saint Octavius of the Future, though it's long in the past now). Salmon fishing and moose hunting are other activities available in the Cap-Chat area, as are hiking, horseback riding, and off-road four-wheel drive excursions in the back country.

In winter, Cap-Chat has a downhill skiing centre, as well as trails for cross-country skiing, snowshoeing, and snowmobiling.

Images

See also
 List of cities in Quebec

References

External links 

 Cap-Chat tourism site
 Éole interpretative centre at the wind farm
 Municipalities and cities of Gaspé region

Cities and towns in Quebec
Incorporated places in Gaspésie–Îles-de-la-Madeleine